Athol McQueen (born 11 November 1941) is an Australian boxer. He competed in the men's heavyweight event at the 1964 Summer Olympics. At the 1964 Summer Olympics, he defeated Tadayuki Maruyama of Japan, before losing to Joe Frazier of the United States.

References

1941 births
Living people
Australian male boxers
Olympic boxers of Australia
Boxers at the 1964 Summer Olympics
Heavyweight boxers